Andy Roddick was the defending champion, but Robin Söderling defeated him 6–3, 7–5 in the final.

Seeds

Qualifying

Draw

Finals

Top half

Bottom half

References
Main Draw

Singles
Brisbane International - Singles